Adam William "Ad" Swigler (September 21, 1895 – February 5, 1975), nicknamed "Doc", was an American professional baseball pitcher. Swigler played for the New York Giants in the  season. 

In 1 career game, he had a 0-1 record, with a 6.00 ERA. He batted and threw right-handed.Due to an arm injury, he did not return to professional baseball, but did continue to play semi-professional ball.

He was an alumnus of the University of Pennsylvania School of Dental Medicine.

Swigler was born and died in Philadelphia.

University of Pennsylvania
Swigler received a baseball scholarship to attend the University of Pennsylvania.  While there, he lettered in baseball, track, football, and basketball. 

After his professional baseball season, Swigler served as the Freshman baseball coach at Penn.

References

External links

1895 births
1975 deaths
New York Giants (NL) players
Major League Baseball pitchers
Baseball players from Philadelphia
Penn Quakers baseball players
Nashville Vols players
Newark Bears (IL) players
University of Pennsylvania School of Dental Medicine alumni
American dentists
United States Army personnel of World War I
United States Army officers
Penn Quakers baseball coaches
Penn Quakers football players